The Daffodil Affair is a 1942 mystery thriller novel by the British writer Michael Innes. It is the eighth in his series featuring John Appleby, a young Detective Inspector in the Metropolitan Police. It takes place during the early years of the Second World War. Like many entries in the series it contains elements of farcical and surrealist humour, and does not follow the standard pattern of the Golden Age detective novel. Like the previous entry in the series Appleby on Ararat it is noted for its exotic setting. In the Times Literary Supplement reviewer Maurice Willson Disher described it as "an incoherent sandwich: alternate slabs of instruction and entertainment".

Synopsis
Appleby is called north to Harrogate on an unusual case. A cab horse named Daffodil has been spirited away from his stables. It seems an otherwise valueless animal except for its trait to be able to discern numbers like a human. At the same time in London, equally intriguingly reports arrive of an reputedly haunted eighteenth century townhouse disappearing from Bloomsbury. At first taken to be the work of German bombers during the Blitz, it has in fact been carefully dismantled and shipped away. To cap it all, two young woman believed to have unusual powers have also been spirited away by a gang. 

Before long Appleby is on a cargo ship heading for South America with his colleague Hudspith who believes they are on the trail of a gang of white slavers. Assuming a cover identity they manage to fall in with the leader of the organisation, who invites them to accompany him to his headquarters. This turns out to be located on a series of islands located high up the River Amazon. He reveals himself as a man who is trying to conduct a vast series of experiments in the supernatural in order to try and corner the market in witchcraft and other unnatural phenomena. With the coming destruction of the globe in the ongoing world war, he foresees even more success for his project. He has lured away or stolen a variety of people of objects he believes will help him complete this mission.

Before long it becomes clear to Appleby that he has seen right through their cover story. He is in fact keeping them there in order to kill one of them in the Bloomsbury mansion - rebuilt in the tropics - to see whether the other can sense or see it telepathically. In this Appleby sees a chance for them to turn the tables on their host and escape.

References

Bibliography
 Hubin, Allen J. Crime Fiction, 1749-1980: A Comprehensive Bibliography. Garland Publishing, 1984.
 Reilly, John M. Twentieth Century Crime & Mystery Writers. Springer, 2015.
 Scheper, George L. Michael Innes. Ungar, 1986.

1942 British novels
British mystery novels
Novels by Michael Innes
British thriller novels
British detective novels
Victor Gollancz Ltd books
Novels set in Yorkshire
Novels set in London
Novels set in Brazil